Meysam Khosravi (born May 18, 1983) is an Iranian footballer who plays for Naft Tehran in the IPL.

Career
Khosravi joined Steel Azin F.C. in 2009 after spending his entire career with Paykan F.C.

Club career statistics

 Assist Goals

References

1983 births
Living people
Paykan F.C. players
Iranian footballers
Steel Azin F.C. players
Foolad FC players
Naft Tehran F.C. players
Persian Gulf Pro League players
Azadegan League players
Association football midfielders